This is a list of seasons completed by the Richmond Spiders men's college basketball team.

Seasons

Notes

Richmond Spiders

Richmond Spiders basketball seasons